The Struggling People's Organization, called until 1996 Lavalas Political Organization (OPL), is a Haitian political party originating from the Lavalas political movement. Formed in 1995, the pro-Aristide Lavalas split from the party in 1996 forming their own Fanmi Lavalas party, at this time the OPL's name was changed from Organisation Politique Lavalas to its present appellation. This split meant that few of the intelligentsia that had previously supported Jean-Bertrand Aristide ended up in the new Lavalas (or Fanmi Lavalas).

The OPL formed a majority of the Haitian Parliament from 1995 to 1997, and named Rosny Smarth as Prime Minister. The OPL was an important supporter of privatization and economic austerity measures, looking to lay off thousands of public sector workers to please international financial institutions. After being declared the losers of the 1997 legislative elections, the OPL denounced the results as fraudulent.  OPL has been heavily financed by foreign governmental agencies and took part in the destabilization campaign against Haiti's constitutional government (2001–2004). In the presidential elections of 7 February2006, its candidate Paul Denis won 2.62% of the popular vote. The party won in the 7 February 2006 Senate elections 6.0% of the popular vote and 3 out of 31 Senators. In the 7 February and 21 April 2006 Chamber of Deputies elections, the party won 10 out of 102 seats. It then formed part of the governing coalition under Jacques-Édouard Alexis.

References

External links
Party website

Foro de São Paulo
Political parties in Haiti